The 2009 SA Tennis Open was a men's tennis tournament played on hard courts outdoors. It is the 18th edition of the SA Tennis Open (and the first since 1995), and is part of the ATP World Tour 250 series of the 2009 ATP World Tour. It took place at the Montecasino in Johannesburg, South Africa from 2 February through 8 February 2009.

The singles line up was led by Association of Tennis Professionals (ATP) No. 7 and 2008 Australian Open runner-up Jo-Wilfried Tsonga. Originally, Gaël Monfils was scheduled to play in the tournament, but later withdrew due to a wrist injury.

Review
The singles competition was won by Frenchman Jo-Wilfried Tsonga who was the top seed for the tournament. On his route to the final he faced unseeded players Thiago Alves, Denis Istomin and Frederico Gil, as well as seventh seed Kristof Vliegen in the quarter-finals, winning them all in straight sets for the loss of only 22 games. His final opponent was his fellow countryman, the fifth-seeded Jérémy Chardy who had progressed against Jiří Vaněk, qualifiers Marco Chiudinelli and Sébastien de Chaunac in straight sets before a more tricky test against second seed David Ferrer. In the final Tsonga came through 7–6, 6–4 to take the title.

Five South African players (Kevin Anderson, Andrew Anderson, Izak van der Merwe, Raven Klaasen and Rik de Voest) were present in the draw and the latter three reached the second round. de Voest knocked out sixth seed Iván Navarro while Klaasen defeated another Spaniard, Rubén Ramírez Hidalgo and van der Merwe overcame Benjamin Becker.

Finals

Singles

 Jo-Wilfried Tsonga defeated   Jérémy Chardy 6–4, 7–6(7–5)
 It was Jo-Wilfried Tsonga's 1st title of the year and his 3rd overall.

Doubles

 James Cerretani /  Dick Norman defeated  Rik de Voest /  Ashley Fisher 6–7(7–9), 6–2, [14–12]

References

External links
 Official website

 
SA Tennis Open
Open
Sports competitions in Johannesburg
2000s in Johannesburg
February 2009 sports events in Africa